Broadview is a neighborhood in northwestern Seattle, Washington, United States.

Location and boundaries

Broadview is bounded on the west by Puget Sound; on the north by the Seattle city limits at N.W. 145th Street, beyond which is The Highlands community in the city of Shoreline; on the east by Greenwood Avenue N., beyond which lies the neighborhood of Bitter Lake; and on the south by Carkeek Park, beyond which, from west to east, are the neighborhoods of Blue Ridge, Crown Hill, and Greenwood.

Name

The name "Broadview" was given to the neighborhood because of its panoramic views of the Puget Sound and Olympic Mountains, which can be viewed to the west from its steep, westerly hillsides.

History

Farmers began to settle in Broadview and neighboring Bitter Lake in June 1889, after the Great Seattle Fire.  These farmers had to float their goods into Seattle via the Puget Sound, because there were no roads at the time.  Eventually, logging began in the area.

Demographics

According to HistoryLink.org, the population of Broadview is approximately 13,000.  The area is mainly residential.

Places
 On the western edge of Broadview is a bluff, below which runs the BNSF Railway mainline along Puget Sound.
 Carkeek Park occupies the southwest corner of the neighborhood along the shoreline. Within it is Pipers Creek.
 Broadview is also home to the historic   E.B. Dunn Gardens designed by the Olmsted firm who are responsible for many of Seattle's parks. The gardens can be toured with a reservation.
 On the northwest side of Broadview bordering the Highlands, Llandover Woods Greenspace is home to many Native Animal and Plant Species such as owls, eagles, mountain beavers, and old-growth trees.  The species have been preserved due to limited residential development in the area.

References